I elfte timmen, (English: At eleventh hour) is a music album recorded by Swedish-Dutch folk singer-songwriter Cornelis Vreeswijk in 1986. Contains selection Vreeswijk's older songs, recorded 
in new, modern versions in attempt to get younger public to the author.

Track listing
"Somliga går i trasiga skor"
"Ångbåtsblus"
"Telegram från en bombad by"
"Tjena assistenten"
"Balladen om Herr Fredrik Åkare och den söta Fröken Cecilia Lind
"Fåglar"
"Jag hade en gång en båt"
"Skyddsrumsboogie"
"Rörande vindriktning"
"Salig Lasse liten"
"Dikt till en gammal dambekant"
"Felicia adjö"

Personnel
Cornelis Vreeswijk - vocal, guitar
Per Alm - guitar
Håkan Lundqvist, Jörgen Bornemark - keyboard.
Lasse Risberg - bass.
Peter Fältskog - drums

Charts

References

Cornelis Vreeswijk albums
1986 albums
Swedish-language albums